Salkımlı may refer to the following places in Turkey:

 Salkımlı, Artvin
 Salkımlı, Kovancılar
 Salkımlı, Kulp